is a train station in Shiraoi, Shiraoi District, Hokkaidō, Japan.

Lines
Hokkaido Railway Company
Muroran Main Line Station H23

Railway stations in Hokkaido Prefecture
Railway stations in Japan opened in 1892